is a railway station in the city of Sōma, Fukushima, Japan, operated by the East Japan Railway Company (JR East).

Lines

Station layout
The station has two opposed side platforms connected to the station building by a footbridge. However, at present platform 2 is not in use. The station has a Midori no Madoguchi staffed ticket office.

Platforms

History
It was renamed Sōma Station on 20 March 1961. The station was closed after the 11 March 2011 Tōhoku earthquake, with services resuming on 21 December only as far as Haranomachi Station. Services were resumed to Hamayoshida Station on 10 December 2016 and full services on 14 March 2020.

Passenger statistics
In fiscal 2018, the station was used by an average of 1144 passengers daily (boarding passengers only).

Surrounding area
 Nakamura Castle ruins
 Sōma City Office
 Sōma Post Office
 Soma General Hospital
 Sōma Jinja

See also
 List of railway stations in Japan

References

External links

  

Railway stations in Fukushima Prefecture
Stations of East Japan Railway Company
Jōban Line
Railway stations in Japan opened in 1897
Sōma, Fukushima